Anilao, officially the Municipality of Anilao,  is a 4th class municipality in the province of Iloilo, Philippines. According to the 2020 census, it has a population of 30,520 people.

Geography

Barangays
Anilao is politically subdivided into 21 barangays.

Climate

Demographics

Economy

One Town One Product
Anilao markets ginamos under the One Town One Product (OTOP) program.

References

External links
 [ Philippine Standard Geographic Code]
 Philippine Census Information
 Local Governance Performance Management System
 Official History of Anilao

Municipalities of Iloilo